Lech Mackiewicz (born 1960 in Skierniewice, Poland) is a Polish actor, director, playwright; graduate of the National Academy of Theatrical Arts (PWST) in Cracow (Poland 1983), and UTS (University of Technology Sydney 1987). He formed Auto Da Fe Theatre Co. in Sydney in 1987. He received the New South Wales Performing Arts Scholarship in 1991; assisted Neil Armfield on the production of Diary of A Madman with Geoffrey Rush at Belvoir St Theatre; directed and acted internationally: Australia, Poland, Japan, Korea, Italy.
Collaborated with Tadashi Suzuki's SCOT (Japan). He studied in Poland (PWST Kraków, grad. 1983), Australia (UTS, grad. 1987) and with the Moscow Arts Theatre (directing secondment - 1991).
Cate Blanchett's first theatre production out of NIDA was Kafka Dances at the Stables Theatre (Sydney 1993) where Lech starred as Franz Kafka and Cate played his fiancée, Felice Bauer.

Filmography
The Remembrance (2011) Tomasz Limanowski 1976
Wygrany (2010) Henryk
Rake (2010) jako George Dana
Jestem Twoj (2009) jako Konstanty
 2008: II wojna światowa za zamkniętymi drzwiami jako tłumacz Władysława Andersa
 1997-2009: Klan jako diler narkotyków
 2008-2009: Na dobre i na złe jako professor Richard Edwards
 2008-2009: Na Wspólnej jako Rafał Sobczak
 2008-2009: Samo Życie jako Kurt Torstensson
 2008: Jestem Twój
 2008: Trzeci oficer jako Wiktor Chenoir
 2008: Jeszcze raz jako Tadeusz
 2008: Glina jako właściciel klubu
 2008: Pseudonim Anoda (spektakl TV) jako Wiktor – major Ministerstwa Bezpieczeństwa Publicznego
 2007: Plebania jako Jerzy
 2007: Lekcje pana Kuki jako siwy mężczyzna
 2007: Kryminalni jako Mateusz Bartnik
 2007: Wszyscy jesteśmy Chrystusami jako lekarz
 2006-2007: Pogoda na piątek jako Jerzy Lewicki, ojciec Bartka i Michała
 2006: Będziesz moja jako dziennikarz Jacek, ojciec Kai
 2006: Oficerowie jako Dyrygent
 2006: Karol - papież, który pozostał człowiekiem (Karol, un Papa rimasto uomo) jako prymas Stefan Wyszyński
 2005: Karol - człowiek, który został papieżem (Karol, un uomo diventato papa) jako prymas Stefan Wyszyński
 2004: Left ear jako Bore
 2003: Zaginiona jako zakonnik specjalizujący się w temacie sekt
 2003: Show jako Ojciec wielodzietny
 2003: Warszawa jako Andrzej
 2003: Rozwód, czyli odrobina szczęścia w miłości jako Malik
 2003: One down
 2003: Marking Time jako Hassan
 2002: Pianista jako Robotnik
 2002: To tu, to tam jako Jasio
 2002: Miss mokrego podkoszulka w Święta polskie jako Adam, mąż Magdy
 2002-2003: Psie serce jako Wojciech Maliszewski, mąż Małgorzaty
 2002: Plebania jako pomocnik Cieplaka
 2002: Julia wraca do domu jako polski lekarz
 2002: As jako Wiktor, nauczyciel wf-u i diler narkotyków
 2002: AlaRm jako Negocjator
 2001: Tam, gdzie żyją Eskimosi jako lekarz na chrzcinach
 2000: Człowiek wózków jako Monte Christo
 2000: 13 posterunek 2 odc. 8 - jako szaleniec, odc. 14 - jako ojciec
 1999: Złotopolscy odc. 146 (Na ratunek) - jako pokerzysta w "Planecie K"
 1999: Jakub kłamca (Jakob the Liar) nie występuje w czołówce
 1999: 4 w 1 jako Wacek Napierowski
 1998: Złotopolscy odc. 53 (Czubatkowa polana), odc. 54 (Narkoman) jako diler narkotyków na Dworcu Centralnym
 1998: Zjazd koleżeński (odc. 7) w Z pianką czy bez jako klient pubu
 1998: Spona jako fotograf Żbik
 1997: Wildside
 1997: Sposób na Alcybiadesa odc. 2, 3 jako fotograf
 1997: Sława i chwała odc. 7 (Równina)
 1997: Krok jako podpułkownik
 1995: Singapore sling: old flames
 1994: Book of dreams: "Welcome to Crateland"
 1993: Seven deadly sins jako Andre
 1990: Till there was you jako Muzza
 1987: Relative merits jako Rick
 1985: Sam pośród swoich jako AK-owiec
 1985: Kochankowie mojej mamy
 1983: Ziarno fotografii
 1982: Odlot jako Marcin
 1981: Wierne blizny jako Polek Żmijewski
 1981: Przypadki Piotra S.

Directed films
Rozwód – Poland 1997
ToTuToTam – Poland 2001
Left Ear – co-director (with Andrew Wholley) 2007

Directed theatre productions
Drzewo – Teatr Wegierki (Poland) 2010
NaGL – Tap Gallery ( Sydney) 2010
Shit Happens – Newtown Theatre ( Sydney)
"Hello Out There (Sydney)
The Island (Sydney)
King Lear – Playbox (Melbourne) 1993
Moj brat moja milosc – Jaracza Theatre (Poland) 1991
Felliniada – Auto Dafe Theatre Co. (Sydney) 1994
BECKETT: IN CIRCLES – SCOT (Japan) 1991
So called K. – Mito Arts Co. (Japan) 1992
Conversations 2 – Auto Da Fe Theatre Co. (Poland) 1996
Madness – PACT Theatre Sydney 1990
Grand Theatre Of Oklahoma (Wharf 2; STC; Sydney)
Krapp's Last Tape ( Poland, Japan, Australia)

As an actor
The Remembrance (2011) Tomasz Limanowski
Wygrany (2010) Henryk
Rake (ep.3 2010) George Dana
Jestem Twoj (Konstanty) 2009
Na dobre i na złe .... Prof. Richard Edwards (1 episode, 2008)
Kontrowersyjny pojedynek (2008) TV episode .... Prof. Richard Edwards
Jeszcze raz (2008) .... Tadeusz
Left Ear (2007) .... Bore
Stolen Life (2007) (voice) .... Faraday
"Kryminalni" .... Mateusz Bartnik (1 episode, 2007)
Znajomy glos (2007) TV episode .... Mateusz Bartnik
Inka 1946 (2007) (TV) .... Jerzy
"Plebania" .... Jerzy / ... (2 episodes, 2002–2007)
Odcinek 848 (2007) TV episode .... Jerzy
Odcinek 223 (2002) TV episode .... Man helping Cieplak
"Oficerowie" (2006) TV mini-series .... Conductor
"Pogoda na piatek" (2006) TV mini-series .... Jerzy
"Bedziesz moja" (2006) TV series .... Jacek
Karol – Un Papa rimasto uomo (2006) (TV) .... Stefan Wyszynski (... aka Karol: The Pope, The Man (USA) ... aka Karol. Papiez, który pozostal czlowiekiem (Poland) )
"The Alice" .... Kirk (3 episodes, 2005)
Episode #1.3 (2005) TV episode .... Kirk
Episode #1.1 (2005) TV episode .... Kirk
Episode #1.2 (2005) TV episode .... Kirk
Karol – Un uomo diventato Papa (2005) (TV) .... Stefan Wyszynski (... aka Karol: A Man Who Became Pope (International: English title) (USA: DVD title) ... aka Karol. Czlowiek, który zostal papiezem (Poland) )
One Down (2004) .... Andrzej
Marking Time (2003) (TV) .... Hassan
Warszawa (2003) .... Andrzej (... aka Warsaw (USA) )
Show (2003)
Alarm (2002) .... Negotiator
Julie Walking Home (2002) .... Polish Doctor (... aka The Healer (Australia: Pay-TV title) (USA: DVD title) ... aka Julia wraca do domu (Poland) ... aka *Julies Reise (Germany) ... aka Retour de Julie, Le (Canada: French title) )
The Pianist (2002) .... Fellow Worker (... aka Pianist, Der (Germany) ... aka Pianista (Poland) ... aka Pianiste, Le (France) )
Where Eskimos Live (2002) (... aka Tam, gdzie zyja Eskimosi (Poland) )
Miss mokrego podkoszulka (2002) (TV) .... Adam, Magda's Husband
Czlowiek wózków (2000)
"Wildside" .... Christian Jasek (1 episode, 1999)
Episode #2.12 (1999) TV episode .... Christian Jasek
Krok (1998) (TV) .... Podpulkownik
Spona (1998) .... Photographer Zbik (... aka Sposób na alcybiadesa (Poland: TV title) )
 Spellbinder: Land of the Dragon Lord as Dr. Elvo (4 episodes, 1997)
 "The Best-Laid Plans..."
 "Barbarians at the Gate"
 "To Live Forever"
 "Girl for Sale"
Singapore Sling: Old Flames (1995) (TV) (... aka Asian Connection: Old Flames (USA) )
Till There Was You (1990) .... Muzza
Kochankowie mojej mamy (1986) (... aka My Mother's Lovers )

As himself
My Mother India (2001) .... Jan

External links

http://www.australianscreen.com.au/people/Lech_Mackiewicz/
http://www.doollee.com/PlaywrightsM/mackiewicz-lech.html

1960 births
Living people
People from Skierniewice
Polish male film actors
Polish male stage actors
Polish male television actors
20th-century Polish male actors
21st-century Polish male actors